The 2015–16 season of the Oberliga Rheinland-Pfalz/Saar, the highest association football league in the states of Saarland and Rhineland-Palatinate, was the eighth season of the league at tier five (V) of the German football league system and the 38th season overall since establishment of the league in 1978, then as the Oberliga Südwest.

The season began on 31 July 2015 and finished on 21 May 2016, interrupted by a winter break from 6 December to 27 February.

2015–16 standings 
The league featured six new clubs for the 2015–16 season with FSV Jägersburg promoted from the Saarlandliga, FK Pirmasens II from the Verbandsliga Südwest and FC Karbach and SV Mehring from the Rheinlandliga while SVN Zweibrücken and TuS Koblenz had been relegated from the Regionalliga Südwest.

Top goalscorers
The top goal scorers for the season:

Promotion play-off
Promotion play-off were held at the end of the season for both the Regionalliga above and the Oberliga.

To the Regionalliga
The runners-up of the Hessenliga, Oberliga Baden-Württemberg and Oberliga Rheinland-Pfalz/Saar competed for one more spot in the Regionalliga Südwest, with each team playing the other just once:

To the Oberliga
The runners-up of the Rheinlandliga, Verbandsliga Südwest and Saarlandliga played each other for one more spot in the Oberliga which SV Morlautern won.

|}

References

External links 
 Oberliga Rheinland-Pfalz/Saar on Fupa.net 

Oberliga Rheinland-Pfalz/Saar
Rheinland